Lambros Lambrou (born September 9, 1977) is a Cypriot former international football defender who last played for Nea Salamis Famagusta FC and  previously for Ermis Aradippou and the national team of Cyprus. In the past he played also for Ethnikos Achnas and Anorthosis.

External links
 

Living people
1977 births
Cypriot footballers
Cyprus international footballers
Association football defenders
Cypriot First Division players
Anorthosis Famagusta F.C. players
Ethnikos Achna FC players
Ermis Aradippou FC players
Nea Salamis Famagusta FC players